The communauté de communes du Pays de Bitche (French for "Land of Bitche community of communes") is a federation of municipalities (communauté de communes), located in the Moselle department of the Grand Est administrative region in north-eastern France. Its seat is the town Bitche.

History 
The Pays de Bitche community of communes was established on December 15, 2009 by a prefectoral decree dating from December 2. It resulted from the merging of 3 of the 4 former Pays de Bitche communauté de communes : Bitche et environs, Volmunster et environs and Pays du Verre et du Cristal.

The last one of the four, the communauté de communes de Rohrbach-lès-Bitche, has merged on January 1, 2017. Since then, every commune of the Bitche canton has been part of the same intercommunality.

Communes 
The communauté de communes consists of the following 46 communes:

 Achen
 Baerenthal
 Bettviller
 Bining
 Bitche
 Bousseviller
 Breidenbach
 Éguelshardt
 Enchenberg
 Epping
 Erching
 Etting
 Goetzenbruck
 Gros-Réderching
 Hanviller
 Haspelschiedt
 Hottviller
 Lambach
 Lemberg
 Lengelsheim
 Liederschiedt
 Loutzviller
 Meisenthal
 Montbronn
 Mouterhouse
 Nousseviller-lès-Bitche
 Obergailbach
 Ormersviller
 Petit-Réderching
 Philippsbourg
 Rahling
 Reyersviller
 Rimling
 Rohrbach-lès-Bitche
 Rolbing
 Roppeviller
 Saint-Louis-lès-Bitche
 Schmittviller
 Schorbach
 Schweyen
 Siersthal
 Soucht
 Sturzelbronn
 Volmunster
 Waldhouse
 Walschbronn

See also 
 Communes of the Moselle department
 Canton of Bitche
 Pays de Bitche

References 

Bitche
Bitche
States and territories established in 2009